Mitsuteru (written: 光輝 or 充央) is a masculine Japanese given name. Notable people with the name include:

, Japanese cyclist
, Japanese aikidoka
, Japanese footballer
, Japanese manga artist

Japanese masculine given names